Nazmiye Demirel (3 January 1927 – 27 May 2013) was the 9th First Lady of Turkey. She was the wife of Süleyman Demirel, the 9th President of Turkey, until her death.

She was born on 3 January 1927 in Isparta. On 12 March 1948 she married Süleyman Demirel, she became the 9th First Lady of Turkey in 1993 when her husband became President. She suffered from Alzheimer's disease since 2005. She died on 27 May 2013 at a hospital in Ankara.

References 

1927 births
2013 deaths
People from Isparta
First Ladies of Turkey
Deaths from dementia in Turkey
Deaths from Alzheimer's disease